Ragojee Bhonsla may refer to:
 Raghoji I Bhonsle (died 1755)
 Raghoji II Bhonsle (died 1816)
 Raghoji III Bhonsle (1808?–1853), grandson of Raghoji II Bhonsle